Eva Arias may refer to:
Eva Arias (model) (born 1985), model from the Dominican Republic
Eva Arias (athlete) (born 1980), Spanish runner